Tour d'Azerbaïdjan was a 2.1 multi-stage bicycle race of the UCI Europe Tour, which took place in Azerbaijan around May between 2012 and 2017. Each day, participants started on a new phase of the race. The race was held in 7 regions of Azerbaijan and finished in the capital, Baku. Other large cities the race moved through were Oguz, Chamakh, Maraza, Ismayilli, Gabala, Sheki.

2012 tour 
From 9 to 13 May 2012 the international cycling tour in memory of Heydar Aliyev was held. The tournament was a logical continuation of the last year's event, "Big Caucasus". But unlike its predecessor, it consisted of five stages, and became the first professional cycle event in the history of independent Azerbaijan. The competitions were held under the auspices of the UCI category 2.2 U23 (for athletes under 23 years old).

In general, the race was attended by 180 cyclists, 16 of whom were women. There were 4 national, 4 continental and 12 club teams, 6 cyclists in each. About fifty members of the support staff accompanied the athletes during the race. Male cyclists competed in individual and team competition, women were competing in personal race.

International cycling tour in memory of the national leader Heydar Aliyev started from square Azadlig (Freedom Square) in Baku.

Women Cycling

The first day of the event included a bicycle race for women. Elena Chalykh from Azerbaijan won the competition. Elena Chalykh, who won the license for the Olympic Games in London, crossed the finish line after making a distance within 34 minutes 57 seconds.

Stage 1

At the first stage the race was held between the 18 men's teams competed in the  distance. Russian club  won, reaching the finish line in 36 minutes 38 seconds. The Kazakh national team was the second to finish, while the German club «Specialized Concept Store» took third place.

Stage 2

On May 10, in the second phase of the tour, cyclists completed a  distance along the route of the Baku-Ismailly, which included three mountain top peaks on the tops of the Greater Caucasus. The winner of stage 2 was the Spanish cyclist Diego Rubio. The first-place winner coped with the distance in 4 hours 41 minutes and 39 seconds. Youcef Reguigui was the leader in the overall standings after the second stage.

Stage 3

Then the riders moved to the highlands, to the cities of Sheki and Oguz. In general, leaving behind a difficult  distance, the competitors finished in Gabala. Dmitry Vernidub took first place on the third stage of the international cycle tour. The third to the line was a Ukrainian Maksym Vasilyev, immediately followed by the winner of the 2nd stage Diego Rubio.

Stage 4

Stage 4 started at Ismailly, then the peloton rode back to Gabala. Gennady Tatarinov, a cyclist from the Russian team, won the stage. He managed to overcome the distance in 2 hours 41 minutes and 18 seconds. Maksym Vasilyev took 2nd place, while Tilegen Maidos from Kazakhstan occupied the third place. Youcef Reguigui maintained his leadership in the overall standings.

Step 5

Participants returned to Baku in order to kick-start the final phase of the competition. For the last stage of the race the cyclists rode 10 laps through the central streets of Baku before they finished. Nurbolat Kulimbetov from Kazakhstan took first place on the stage, completing the distance in 2 hours 57 minutes and 16 seconds. Gennady Tatarinov, the winner of the previous stage, occupied the second place. Issiaka Cissé from Côte d'Ivoire was the third to cross the finish line.

Winners
Youcef Reguigui who held the leadership in the overall standings from the second stage, remained confident in his position, winning the blue jersey. Maksym Vasilyev, gaining maximum points, received the green jersey of the best sprinter, and Bakhtiyar Kozhatayev became a winner of the mountain category.

In the team competition the first place was taken by the Russian team  (43:51:04), World Cycling Centre were second (43:51:20), and Ukrainians  third (43:52:50).

Pat McQuaid, president of the UCI, expressed a warm welcome and congratulations to the winners, adding that the competition was held at the highest level, in compliance with all international standards. Bicycle Federation of Azerbaijan has made big effort to carry out such an important international event on a high level and in accordance with all international requirements.

2013 tour 
The Tour d'Azerbaïdjan started in Baku by the Heydar Aliyev Foundation. On the second stage, the peloton started from the bike park, located on the shore of the Caspian Sea in Baku, riding towards the Caucasus Mountains. The stage finished in Ismailly, after . For the third stage, the competitors rode from Gabala through Oguz and on to Sheki, before returning to Gabala, after . Stage 4 also started in Gabala, where the peloton rode to Shamakhi and finished after  in Pirguli, near the famous Observatory.

List of overall winners

See also 
Cycling in Azerbaijan
Tour of Azerbaijan

References

External links 

https://web.archive.org/web/20130404053839/http://avif.az/en/node/62
http://www.velowire.com/UCIcyclingcalendar/race/1178/tour-de-azerbaijan.html
http://www.extratime.az/article.php?aid=298074
http://www.cyclingfever.com/editie.html?editie_id=23818
http://www.procyclingstats.com/race/118368011-Tour-de-Azerbaijan-2013

 
UCI Europe Tour races
Cycle races in Azerbaijan
Recurring sporting events established in 2012
Recurring sporting events disestablished in 2017
Spring (season) events in Azerbaijan